= Miss European =

Miss European is a beauty pageant of between 95 and 100 contestants aged 16 to 30 from France, Belgium, the Netherlands, England, Wales, Ireland, Malta and in 2011 both Scotland and Portugal joined the contest. The pageant was founded by Claude Pasbbecq in France in 1996 as Miss International. It changed its name to Miss Euroregion in 1999 and became Miss European in 2006. In 2013 Georgia joined making it one of the biggest beauty pageants in the world. The contest involves 3 rounds where contestants take part in Clubwear, Swimwear and an Evening Dress round. There is also a Team Dance which must include all team members. This is judged separately. This part of the contest has become increasingly popular.

== Winners ==
=== 1996-2010 ===
This pageant was dominated by the French and Belgian contestants who had won the title every year between 1996 and 2004. In 2005 Laura Livesy, from Team Wales, became the first Welsh and British girl to win the pageant. On 5 November 2006, in Ypres, Belgium, Sasha Buckingham (Miss Kent), aged 17 from Folkestone in Kent, became the first English girl to win the coveted title, she also won the title of best dancer/model and helped team England walk away as winners of the much contested Dance competition. It was the first year England won both 1st & 2nd Place, with the 1st Princess title going to Danielle Chatterton of Deal. (Folkestone was where the first ever International Beauty Pageant took place on 14 August 1908 – the year before the first Miss World contest took place, which was also held in Folkestone and was won by the London beauty of Nellie Dawson)

In 2007 Amy Fuller, 20 from Hastings carried on England's reign to become Miss European. To add to this Fuller also won the 'Miss Congeniality' sash, as voted for by the other contestants. Amy is the first girl to have won both sashes. Emma Finch, from Folkestone, won the title of European Dauphine.

In 2008 and 2009 the crown went back to Belgium and in 2010 Malta won the crown for the first time with Katrina Pavia taking the top sash of Miss European.

=== 2011 ===
Rachael Tate from Wales is the winner for 2011. She also won Spirt of Miss European as voted for by Hotel staff.

The competition is held over seven days six nights. This year 2012 it is at the Adriana Beach Club Portugal (last year in Folkestone England). The Teams during their stay attend show rehearsals in the morning, cultural/shopping trips in the afternoon and Formal Dinners/discos/parties in the evening. On the Friday night there is a Team Dance competition for each country, which all ten team members must take part. Saturday is the Grand final and consists of three rounds, Club wear, Swimwear and Evening dress. Then on the same night is the semi-final, when three girls from each Team go through and are judged on self presentation. One girl then (The European Princess for each Country) goes through to the final and Miss European is chosen.

The Competition this year is on Monday 15 October until Sunday 21 October 2012 and there are 13 Teams/Countries entering England, Scotland, Wales, Ireland, Belgium, Netherlands, Malta, France, Portugal, Kosovo, Germany, Romania and Albania. A total of 130 girls will compete.

=== 2012 ===
Deone Robertson from Team Scotland is the current title holder of Miss European. She won the title in 2012 in Portugal. Team Scotland were also the winners of the coveted Team Dance trophy in this year.

=== 2013 ===
Miss Kerry-Anne Vinson of Team England was Miss European 2013, winning the title in Malta in November.

=== 2015 ===
Emma Franklin.
